The Mosalem Formation is a geologic formation in Illinois. It preserves fossils dating back to the Silurian period.

See also

 List of fossiliferous stratigraphic units in Illinois

References
 

Silurian Iowa
Silurian Illinois
Silurian southern paleotropical deposits